The 2020 Solingen killings occurred on 3 September 2020 at 11:45 am, police found five children dead in Solingen, a city in North Rhine-Westphalia, Germany. The children were siblings aged eight, six, three, two and one. They were discovered in a flat in a tower block in Hasseldelle. The victims' 11-year-old brother survived. The children's 27-year-old mother was seriously injured when she threw herself in front of a train in Düsseldorf. She is being treated in hospital under police guard.

See also
 Hanau shootings

References

2020 murders in Germany
2020s in North Rhine-Westphalia
Crime in North Rhine-Westphalia
September 2020 events in Germany
Solingen